Heterodera bergeniae  is a plant pathogenic  nematode in Pakistan.

References 

bergeniae
Plant pathogenic nematodes
Fauna of Pakistan
Nematodes described in 1988